False Step was a New Zealand Standardbred racehorse. He is notable in that he won three New Zealand Trotting Cup
races, the richest harness race, and sometimes the richest horse race in New Zealand. False Step is one of three horses to win the NZ Trotting Cup three times, the others being Indianapolis and Terror to Love.

False Step was also taken to the United States in 1960 by his trainer and reinsman Cecil Devine, who had driven him to victory three times in the New Zealand Cup. The horse scored success in the International Series at Yonkers Raceway, and also defeated the acknowledged American champion of the time, Adios Butler.

Major races
He won the following major races:
 1955 New Zealand Trotting Derby 
 1958 New Zealand Trotting Cup 
 1959 New Zealand Trotting Cup (handicapped 24 yards)
 1960 New Zealand Trotting Cup (handicapped 48 yards)

See also
 Harness racing in New Zealand

Reference list

External links
 False Step in the 1958 NZ Cup 
 False Step in the 1959 NZ Cup 
 False Step in the 1960 NZ Cup

New Zealand standardbred racehorses
Harness racing in New Zealand
New Zealand Trotting Cup winners
1952 racehorse births